The Untold Story is a 1993 Hong Kong crime-thriller film directed by Herman Yau and starring Danny Lee and Anthony Wong, with the former also serving as the film's producer.

The film is based on the "Eight Immortals Restaurant murders" that took place on 4 August 1985 in the Hei Sha Wan section of Areia Preta, Nossa Senhora de Fátima, Portuguese Macau. While the massacre involving a family of 10 did occur at the restaurant, the alleged cannibalism is sensationalism inferred from the incomplete discovery of the victims' corpse, only finding limbs, and that there was a lack of telltale smell of decomposition despite the summer tropical heat.

The film was followed up by two unrelated sequels with The Untold Story 2, featuring Wong returning in a supporting role, and The Untold Story 3 with Lee returning in another role.

Plot
The story opens in 1978 with an argument in a small Hong Kong apartment. Wong Chi-hang (Anthony Wong) brutally beats a gambler named Keung (James Ha) nearly to death for refusing to lend him money before burning him alive. He quickly flees the Hong Kong police by burning his identification documents and changing his name.

The film then flashes forward to Macau in 1986, where a family discovers a bag of rotten limbs washed up on the beach. Police officers Bull (Parkman Wong), Robert (Eric Kei), King Kong (Lam King Kong) and Bo (Emily Kwan) arrive on the scene before being joined by their supervisor Inspector Lee (Danny Lee). The cops examine the limbs and take them in for examination.

Wong Chi Hang is then shown to be working at the Eight Immortals Restaurant where he receives and tears up a letter meant for Cheng Lam, the former owner of the restaurant. It is then shown that the restaurant is still in Cheng Lam's ownership and Wong is unable to procure it officially without the former's signature, who is mysteriously absent.

King Kong and Bo take one of the arms to a forensics analyst who identifies the arm as that of Chan Lai Chun, Cheng Lam's mother in law. Robert also receives a letter from Cheng Lam's older brother addressed to the Macau police department, saying that Cheng Lam has mysteriously disappeared.

Wong is later caught cheating at Mahjong by a waiter who works in the restaurant. When confronted about it, Wong stabs him in the eye with a restaurant's reception check spindle and beats him to death with a large soup spoon before dismembering his corpse and turning it into pork buns. He then disposes of the bones by putting them in the dumpster.

Inspector Lee orders the other cops to investigate the restaurant after reading the letter. When interviewed, Wong tells Bull and Robert that Cheng Lam has gone away and sold the shop to him while Pearl (Julie Lee) tells Bo of the letters from the mainland the restaurant has received. Wong shoos the cops away after giving them free pork buns.

That night, Wong corners Pearl and brutally beats and tortures her before raping her and stabbing her pelvis with chopsticks, killing her. He then dismembers her corpse as well.

Inspector Lee and his team later visit the restaurant, whereupon Wong acts suspiciously when questioned by Lee who then places 24 hour surveillance on Wong.

Wong is caught trying to dispose of evidence linking him to Cheng Lam by Robert and Bo and is detained by the team while trying to cross the border to China.

Inspector Lee pieces the whole case together, summating that Wong murdered Cheng Lam and his family before stealing his restaurant. Wong denies this and Lee has Robert and Bull beat Wong to make him confess. Wong breaks free during his torture and shows his wounds to the press, claiming Police Brutality.

Not wanting to have a lawsuit on their hands, Lee throws Wong into prison, where he shares the same block as Cheng Poon (Shing Fui On), Cheng Lam's younger brother. He is then savagely beaten by Poon and his gang day and night to the point of internal bleeding. In order to escape, Wong attempts suicide by slashing his wrist and biting it, leading to him being rushed to the hospital.

Lee and Robert are approached by a pair of Hong Kong police detectives who reveal Wong's real name and origin as a Hong Kong gambler named Chan Chi Leung and that they have enough evidence to charge him for the murder of Keung whom he burned to death many years ago. The detectives offer Lee a Plan B, which is to extradite Wong to Hong Kong if they cannot find evidence to charge Wong. Lee refuses.

Wong briefly escapes from the hospital by taking a nurse hostage and overpowering King Kong. But he is stopped by Bull and is beaten up once again.

Lee then organizes endless torture for Wong until he confesses. Including injecting him with drugs, inducing insomnia, causing blisters on his skin and frequent beatings. After days of torture, Wong finally confesses.

It all started when Wong was just a cook in Cheng Lam's restaurant. After Wong cheated at Mahjong, Cheng owed him a debt of 183,300 dollars which he refused to pay. Wong then took Cheng's wife and 5 children hostage. He first cut the throat of Cheng's son before stabbing his wife and Cheng himself. He then butchered the remaining children alive. Later on, he lured Cheng Lam’s mother-in-law into the restaurant where he killed her as well. After the gruesome murders, Wong began to dispose of the bodies by dismembering them before disposing the other body parts in the ocean and in the dumpster. He then later confessed that he turned his victims into pork buns during the process.

After confessing, Wong is sent back to prison where after one final confrontation with Lee and Bull, commits suicide by slashing his wrists. The narration notes that while there was indeed enough evidence to charge Wong for the murders, it never happened due to Wong's death.

Cast and roles

Reception

Category III rating
In Hong Kong, due to its explicit and disturbing depictions of sex, violence and gore involving the Wong Chi-hang character, The Untold Story was awarded a Category III rating (Persons Aged 18 and Above Only), the equivalent of the United States' NC-17 or X-ratings.

Box office
Despite its restrictive Category III rating, the managed to grossed an exceptional HK$15,763,018 at the Hong Kong box office during its theatrical run from 13 May to 2 June 1993.

Awards
The Untold Story won its only nomination, with Anthony Wong winning his first award for Best Actor at the 13th Hong Kong Film Awards.

See also 

 Eight Immortals Restaurant murders

References

External links

House of Horrors page

1993 films
1993 crime thriller films
1993 horror films
Crime horror films
Hong Kong horror thriller films
Hong Kong crime thriller films
Crime films based on actual events
Hong Kong splatter films
Hong Kong serial killer films
Police detective films
Films about cannibalism
Films about child death
1990s Cantonese-language films
Films directed by Herman Yau
Films set in Macau
Films set in 1978
Films set in 1986
1990s exploitation films
1990s Hong Kong films